Roméo Calenda (born August 21, 1972 in Meulan, Yvelines) is a French football player, who currently plays for ES Saint-Benoit.

Career
He was part of Paris SG squad at the 1996 UEFA Super Cup.

References

External links
 

1972 births
Living people
People from Meulan-en-Yvelines
French footballers
Paris Saint-Germain F.C. players
Ligue 1 players
LB Châteauroux players
Ligue 2 players
Stade Lavallois players
ASOA Valence players
Stade Poitevin FC players
Association football midfielders
Footballers from Yvelines